Jake's Tower is a young adult novel written by Elizabeth Laird. It was first published in 2001.  The  book was shortlisted for the Carnegie Medal and the Guardian Children's Fiction Prize.
The main protagonist is Jake, a teenager living with his mom and his step dad in england. His step dad is violent and often in the pub, so Jake's mum and Jake went out to Jakes Grandma, the mother of Jake's dad. It' a great story about the problems of a teenager with a violent dad.

Plot summary
Every day life for Jake is a struggle due to his mother's horrible and violent boyfriend, Steve. To escape his problems, Jake dreams of having his own tall tower where he can be peaceful and safe. In his pretend tower he daydreams of his father, who gave him a hug and a fluffy duck when he was born. Though certain he will never see him again, Jake believes that he might somehow get to meet him one day.

But when the struggle becomes too much for Jake and his mother, they run away from Steve to Jake's grandmother (his father's mother, Mrs. Judd). While Mrs. Judd had not believed that Jake was her grandson, upon meeting him she sees his resemblance to his father and accepts and protects him from the danger that he is in. However, Jake's mother insists on fighting for Jake's custody, resulting in a case conference between Jake's mother and his grandmother.

Meanwhile, Jake befriends Kieran, a boy from school, and they agree to go to and from school with each other. When Kieran is sick one day, Jake takes a shortcut, only to be apprehended by the one person he did not want to meet: Steve. Steve grabs Jake, but immediately releases him when Jake's teacher come out. However, when his teacher leaves, Steve starts to intimidate Jake again. Jake manages to escape to his grandmother's house, where Mrs. Judd manages to get rid of Steve when he follows Jake.

The following day Jake returns home from school while Mrs Judd and his mother are at his case conference. Suddenly the door opens - standing at the living room door is Jake's father.

References

External links
Jake's Tower at the author's website
Jake's Tower at Fantastic Fiction

2001 British novels
British young adult novels
Macmillan Publishers books